Freddy Wexler is an American songwriter, producer and creator. He has written songs for artists such as Ariana Grande, Justin Bieber, Post Malone,  BlackPink, Selena Gomez, Lil Wayne, Halsey, Jonas Brothers, Demi Lovato, Pink, Kanye West, Pusha T, Wyclef Jean, Steve Aoki, Celine Dion, and Diana Ross. He was nominated for a Grammy Award for Album of the Year at the 64th Annual Grammy Awards, for his work on Justice (Justin Bieber album).

Wexler is the founder of The Brain Music, a 360 music company specializing in records and publishing. The Brain has joint ventures with Disney, Scooter Braun Projects, Warner Chappell, and Prescription (Rx) Songs.

Wexler is also known by the pseudonym Jackson Penn, under which he has released several records.

Biography

2005-2008 
Wexler began his career as an A&R intern for Sony Music. In this role, he pitched then-unknown artist Stefani Germonatta (who would become Lady Gaga) as "the next Madonna" and recorded her early demos. At 19, Wexler signed a record deal. He then wrote and produced full-time for other artists and signed a contract with EMI Music Publishing. Wexler subsequently wrote songs for multiple recording artists and television shows, including "Dancing with the Stars" and "The Bachelorette."

2008-2009
While Wexler was attending college, celebrity morning show host Kidd Kraddick called him on the air and invited him to participate in a weeklong tour concluding with a performance on Kraddick's show.

2009-2011
He started a music management company, where he represented several recording artists, including Rachel Platten. The following year, Wexler built The Brain House, an "experimental songwriting collective" in the Hollywood Hills, where he invited a group of writers, musicians, and artists to live and work together.

2012-present 
Wexler founded The Brain Music, a cross-platform record label, artist management company, and publishing company. In 2017, he began releasing music under the pseudonym Jackson Penn. In 2018, he started The Freddy Wexler Company. Wexler cowrote the single "Stuck with U" by Justin Bieber and Ariana Grande, which hit #1 on the Billboard Hot 100 chart. Proceeds from the song benefitted families of COVID-19 first responders. Music Business Worldwide named Wexler one of the "World’s Greatest Songwriters" in 2020.

Career 
His songs have been recorded by artists including Justin Bieber, Ariana Grande, Selena Gomez, Kanye West, the Jonas Brothers, Demi Lovato, Pink, Post Malone, Celine Dion, Halsey, Zayn Malik,  Steve Aoki, Martin Garrix, Avicii, DNCE, Pusha T, Bea Miller, and Wyclef Jean.

Select Discography

Songs by Freddy Wexler
Ariana Grande and Justin Bieber - "Stuck with U" (Universal Music Group)
Halsey and Marshmello - "Be Kind" (Universal Music Group)
Blackpink - Born Pink (Interscope)
"Hard To Love"
Celine Dion - Courage
"Perfect Goodbye"
Jonas Brothers - "Like It's Christmas" (Universal Republic)
P!nk - Hurts 2 B Human (RCA) 
"My Attic"
ZAYN - Icarus Falls (RCA)
"Talk to Me"
DNCE - People to People
"Lose My Cool" (Universal Republic)
Fifty Shades Freed  [Original Motion Picture Soundtrack] (Republic)
 "Wolf" by The Spencer Lee Band
 The Spencer Lee Band
 "Kissing Tree" (Universal Republic)
Kanye West - The Life of Pablo
 "Wolves" (Good Music, Def Jam)
Lil Wayne - Tha Carter IV (Certified Triple Platinum Worldwide) (Universal Republic)
 "Novacane"
Selena Gomez - Stars Dance (Certified Platinum) (Hollywood Records) 
 "Slow Down" (Certified Platinum)
 "B.E.A.T."
Bea Miller
 "Fire N Gold" (Certified Gold) (Hollywood Records)
Moxie Raia feat. Pusha T
 "On My Mind" (Def Jam)
Steve Aoki and Moxie Raia
 "I Love It When You Cry" (Ultra Music)
Martin Garrix
 "Break Through the Silence" (Spinnin' Records)
Prince Royce
 "Lie to Me" (RCA)
Tiesto
 "Footprints ft. Cruickshank" (Casablanca Records)
Bridgit Mendler - Hello My Name Is... (Hollywood Records)
 "Top of the World"
 "City Lights"
 "Love Will Tell Us Where To Go"
 "Hold On For Dear Love"
 "Quicksand" (deluxe edition bonus track)
Demi Lovato - Demi (Hollywood Records)
Without the Love
Neiked feat Kes Kross and Jackson Penn
"Sometimes"
Swanky Tunes
 "Wherever U Go" (Armada Music)
Moxie Raia
 "Buffalo Bill" (Capitol Records)
 "I Love It When You Cry" (Moxoki)  (Ultra Music)
Charles Perry
 "Stranger to Love" (Verve Records)
Jackson Penn (pseudonym for Freddy Wexler)
"Streetlights on Mars" (2017)
"Streetlights on Mars 2.0" (2017)
"California" (2018)
"Babylon" (2018)
"Sick in the Head" (2019)
"My Girl" (2019)
"After All" (2020)

References

External links
 

1986 births
Living people
American DJs
American male singer-songwriters
Record producers from New York (state)
Singer-songwriters from New York (state)
21st-century American singers
21st-century American male singers